David Marshall Lang (6 May 1924 – 20 March 1991), was a Professor of Caucasian Studies, School of Oriental and African Studies, University of London. He was one of the most productive British scholars who specialized in Georgian, Armenian and ancient Bulgarian history.

Biography 
Lang was born in Bromley and was educated at Monkton Combe School and St John’s College, Cambridge where he was a Major Scholar and later held a Fellowship. As a 20-year-old graduate, he was serving as an officer in Iran in 1944 when he was appointed as acting Vice-Consul in Tabriz, Iran. He met many of the city's Armenian people and leaders.  

In 1949 he was the member of staff for the School of Oriental and African Studies at University of London. He began as Lecturer in Georgian language, then as Reader and in 1964 he became Professor of Caucasian Studies. In 1953 he held a Senior Fellowship at the Russian Institute of Columbia University and in 1965 he was a visiting Professor in Caucasian Studies at the University of California, Los Angeles. Between 1962 and 1964 he was Honorary Secretary of the Royal Asiatic Society of London.

Lang visited Soviet Armenia three times during the 1960s and 1970s. He visited the Soviet Union in December 1963 and was allegedly recruited at that time by the KGB, according to archivist Vasili Mitrokhin, who copied KGB files in Moscow. Mitrokhin also refers to Lang's career as an operative of English counter-intelligence. According to the dates in The Mitrokhin Archive, this would have taken place before Lang was 20 years old.

Historian Donald Rayfield alleged that Lang befriended Alexi Inauri, the head of the Georgian KGB. Ianuri may have persuaded Lang to publicly denounce anti-Soviet dissidents in Georgia.

For a long time, Lang directed the Caucasian Studies Department at the University of London. He lectured in Caucasian languages and history at Cambridge and various universities around the world.

Selected bibliography
The Wisdom of Balahvar (London: George Allen & Unwin Ltd, 1957)
The Last Years of the Georgian Monarchy, 1658-1832 (New York: Columbia University Press, 1957)
First Russian Radical, Alexander Radischev, 1749-1802 (London: George Allen & Unwin, 1959)
A Modern History of Georgia (London: Weidenfeld and Nicolson, 1962)
The Georgians (New York: Praeger, 1966)
Armenia: Cradle of Civilization (London: George Allen & Unwin, 1970)
The Peoples of the Hills: Ancient Ararat and Caucasus by Charles Allen Burney and D.M. Lang (London: Weidenfeld and Nicolson, 1971)
Bulgarians: From Pagan Times to the Ottoman Conquest (London: Thames and Hudson, 1976)
Lives and Legends of the Georgian Saints (New York: Crestwood, 1976)
The Armenians: A People in Exile (London: Allen and Unwin, 1981)
Armenia and Karabagh: the Struggle for Unity (London: Minority Rights Group, 1991)

Notes

See also 
Kartvelian studies

1924 births
1991 deaths
Academics of SOAS University of London
Alumni of St John's College, Cambridge
British expatriates in Iran
Historians of Georgia (country)
Armenian studies scholars
People educated at Monkton Combe School
20th-century British historians